Stevrek (in Bulgarian: Стеврек) is a village in northern Bulgaria, Antonovo municipality, Targovishte Province. Until recently it was part of Elena Municipality, Veliko Tarnovo Province. There is a Roman bridge nearby.

External links 
 http://gallery.guide-bulgaria.com/a/12505/stevrek_the_roman_bridge

Villages in Targovishte Province